Francis Bible Schulte, O.H.S. (December 23, 1926 – January 17, 2016) was an American prelate of the Roman Catholic Church. He served as archbishop of the Archdiocese of New Orleans in Louisiana from 1989 to 2002.

Schulte previously served as bishop of the Diocese of Wheeling-Charleston in West Virginia from 1985 to 1989 and as an auxiliary bishop of the Archdiocese of Philadelphia in Pennsylvania from 1981 to 1985.

Biography

Early life 
Francis Schulte was born on December 23, 1926, in Philadelphia, Pennsylvania, the only child of John Schulte, a pharmacist, and his wife, Katherine (née Bible) Schulte. His parents had him baptized with both their surnames. As a child, his parents enrolled him at Norwood Academy for Boys in Philadelphia. Schulte then studied at St. Joseph's Preparatory School in Philadelphia.

Deciding to become a priest, with his mother's strong support, Schulte enrolled at St. Charles Borromeo Seminary in Overbrook, Pennsylvania. He later studied at the University of Pennsylvania, obtaining a Master of Political Science.  Schulte then did more graduate studies at Oxford University in England, and at the Harvard Graduate School of Education.

Priesthood 
Schulte was ordained to the priesthood by Cardinal John Francis O’Hara on May 10, 1952, for the Archdiocese of Philadelphia.  After his ordination, Schulte was named by Archbishop John F. O'Hara to serve as a faculty member and department head of various Philadelphia-area parochial schools.

Archbishop John Krol appointed Schulte as an assistant superintendent of the archdiocesan schools in 1960.  He became superintendent of the schools in 1970. Schulte was raised to the rank of papal chamberlain by Pope Paul VI, and was named pastor of St. Margaret Parish in Narberth, Pennsylvania, in 1980.

Auxiliary Bishop of Philadelphia 
On June 27, 1981, Schulte was appointed an auxiliary bishop of his archdiocese and the titular Bishop of Afufenia by Pope John Paul II. He was consecrated on August 12, 1981, with Cardinal Krol as his principal consecrator and Bishops John J. Graham and Martin N. Lohmuller serving as co-consecrators.

Bishop of Wheeling-Charleston 
On June 4, 1985, John Paul II named Schulte as the sixth bishop of the Diocese of Wheeling-Charleston.

Archbishop of New Orleans 
John Paul II appointed Schulte as the twelfth archbishop of the Archdiocese of New Orleans on December 6, 1988; he was installed on February 14, 1989. Population shifts in the archdiocese forced Schulte to close or merge several parishes. He also restructured the school system of the archdiocese.

Schulte served as the chairman of the United States Conference of Catholic Bishops' Committee on Education, helping to write and research a document on the role local bishops and archbishops should play in Catholic universities within their jurisdictions. In 1992, he created the archdiocese's first formal process for dealing with complaints of sexual abuse by priests or other church employees. In addition to Schulte's duties in the archdiocese, in 1992 he also took on the leadership of the Order of the Holy Sepulchre for the Southeastern United States, being named the grand prior of that region.

Retirement 
On January 3, 2002. John Paul II accepted Schulte's resignation as archbishop of New Orleans. After being diagnosed with prostate cancer in 2005, his doctors suggested he move to Philadelphia for treatment as New Orleans was dealing with the aftermath of Hurricane Katrina.

After spending time in a nursing home in Philadelphia, Francis Schulte died there on January 17, 2016,at age 89. His remains were interred in the crypt of the Cathedral Basilica of St. Louis, King of France in New Orleans.

References

1926 births
2016 deaths
Clergy from Philadelphia
St. Joseph's Preparatory School alumni
University of Pennsylvania alumni
Harvard Graduate School of Education alumni
Alumni of the University of Oxford
Roman Catholic bishops of Wheeling–Charleston
Roman Catholic archbishops of New Orleans
20th-century Roman Catholic archbishops in the United States
21st-century Roman Catholic archbishops in the United States
Grand Priors of the Order of the Holy Sepulchre
Deaths from prostate cancer
Deaths from cancer in Pennsylvania
Burials at St. Louis Cathedral (New Orleans)